Hurlbut Township is located in Logan County, Illinois. As of the 2020 census, its population was 338 and it contained 136 housing units.

Geography

Demographics

References

External links
US Census
City-data.com
Illinois State Archives

Townships in Logan County, Illinois
Townships in Illinois